Baci Lingerie is a large retailer of women's lingerie founded in the United States, with multiple stores located internationally on several continents.

History
Officially presented to the public in April 2010 at the International Lingerie Show in Las Vegas, Nevada, the company was started by Internetmarketing-Miami, LLC. Deriving its company name from the Italian word “kisses”, the company invested huge amount of money in advertising and marketing campaigns and exhibiting at several industry shows around the world, like Venus Fair in Berlin, Germany during October 2010 and Salon de la Lingerie Show in Paris, France, in January 2011.

Products and marketing
The shoots have featured castles in Southern Germany, the United Kingdom, and France. The resulting images are used in Baci's packaging, website, and catalogs.
	
Baci Lingerie coordinated a photo shoot in 2013, which took place in a Hollywood Hills mansion and featured its 23-piece Corsets by Baci Collection.

Baci Lingerie provides tools for retailers in merchandising and marketing, including planograms, creative events (including the Baci Lash Bar), educational tools (newsletters, merchandising plans, seminars, blogs), and contests.

Philanthropy
Baci Lingerie claims to have philosophy of social consciousness and philanthropy as its integral aspects. Through contributions and fundraisers, including Baci's annual charity dinner, the company raises money for a variety of organizations and causes.

Eileen Stein Jacoby Fund
Baci Lingerie raised over $8,000 for the Fox Chase Cancer Center and Eileen Stein Jacoby Fund to advance cancer research and education, at Baci's second semiannual charity dinner in April 2013. The charity dinner was held during the International Lingerie Show. Baci raised $4,400 for the fund in 2012.

Bra Recyclers
Baci Lingerie supported The Bra Recyclers in its drive to collect 15,000 bras in October 2012 to help raise awareness of Breast Cancer and Domestic Violence Month. The Bra Recyclers is a textile recycling company that specializes in recycling and reusing bras that would unnecessarily go to landfills, and assist in providing deserving women with used or unused bras as they transition back to self-sufficiency.

Revlon Run / Walk
Baci Lingerie participated in the 2013 Entertainment Industry Fund (EIF) Revlon Run / Walk For Women, to raise funds for women's cancer research. Approximately 15 Baci employees, family members, and friends participated in the 20th annual 5k run / walk fundraiser as “Team Baci Babes” on May 11, 2013, at the Los Angeles Memorial Coliseum at Exposition Park.

XO Oklahoma
Baci Lingerie donated 1176 brand new bras of various styles to victims of the 2013 tornadoes in Moore, Oklahoma – a total retail value of over $15,000. Hugs and Kisses, or XO, is a project by the Kerr Foundation, formed to gather and distribute new and gently used clothing and accessory items for women and men affected by the Moore tornado disaster.

Free The Girls
Baci Lingerie donated 5077 brand new bras of various styles – a total retail value of over $60,000. Free The Girls provides an opportunity for women rescued from sex trafficking to earn a living selling second-hand clothing, while going to school, getting healthy, and caring for their families.

Sponsorships
 2010	Adult Entertainment Expo
 2010	Venus International Trade Fair
 2011	Venus International Trade Fair 
 2012	Porn to Rock
 2012	Capital Cabaret Fashion Show
 2012	Venus International Trade Fair 
 2012	Déjà Vu Holiday Soiree
 2013	Cape Town SEXPO
 2013	Sydney SEXPO.
 2013	The Sex Awards

Awards

|-
|2010
|Outstanding Apparel or Accessory Brand		
|AVN Awards			
|
|-
|2010			
|Outstanding Marketing Campaign	
|AVN Awards		
|
|-
|2010	
|Outstanding Packaging		
|AVN Awards			
|
|-
|2011			
|Best Lingerie or Apparel Company
|AVN Awards			
|
|-
|2011			
|Lingerie Manufacturer of the Year
|XBIZ Awards			
|
|-
|2011 		
|Outstanding Apparel / Accessory Brand (Black Label) 
|AVN Awards	
|	
|-
|2011		
|Outstanding Marketing Campaign (Black Label)	
|AVN Awards	
|
|-
|2011			
|Best Erotic Clothing Brand
|ETO Awards			
|
|-
|2011		
|Lingerie Manufacturer of the Year
|StorErotica Awards			
| 
|-
|2011			
|Marketing Campaign of the Year
|XBIZ Awards			
|
|-
|2012		
|Lingerie Manufacturer of the Year 
|StorErotica Awards			
|
|-
|2012		
|Costume Manufacturer of the Year 
|StorErotica Awards			
|
|-
|2012		
|Best Lingerie or Apparel Company
|AVN Awards				
|
|-
|2012		
|Best Sex Accessory (Eyelashes)	
|AVN Awards			
|
|-
|2012			
|Lingerie / Apparel Company of the Year	
|XBIZ Awards	
|
|-
|2012	
|Sensual Accessory Product of the Year (Eyelashes)
|XBIZ Awards		
|
|-
|2012			
|Best Lingerie Brand	
|ETO Awards			
|
|-
|2012			
|Outstanding Lingerie Collection (White Label)	
|AVN Awards
|
|-
|2012		
|Outstanding Packaging (Dreams Collection)	
|AVN Awards		
|
|-
|2013			
|Best Lingerie or Apparel Company
|AVN Awards			
|
|-
|2013		
|Lingerie Manufacturer of the Year 
|StorErotica Awards			
|
|-
|2013		
|Costume Manufacturer of the Year 	
|StorErotica Awards		
|
|-
|2014			
|Lingerie / Apparel Company of the Year		
|XBIZ Awards
|
|-
|2014 		
|Lingerie Collection of the Year (Dreams 2)
|XBIZ Awards			
|
|-
|2014			
|Sensual Accessory Product of the Year (Luna Veneziana Masquerade Collection)	
|XBIZ Awards	
|
|-
|2014			
|Sensual Accessory Product of the Year (Eyelashes)
|XBIZ Awards	
|
|-
|2014			
|Marketing Campaign of the Year		
|XBIZ Awards	
|
|-
|2014 			
|Luxury Toy / Line of the Year (Shiri Zinn for Baci)
|XBIZ Awards	
|
|-
|2014		
|Outstanding Packaged Lingerie Line	
|AVN Awards		
|
|-
|2014 		
|Outstanding Costume Lingerie Collection (Dreams 2)	
|AVN Awards	
|
|-
|2014			
|Outstanding Accessory Product Year (Luna Veneziana Masquerade Collection)		
|AVN Awards
|
|-
|2014	
|Outstanding Packaged Lingerie Line (Envy)
|AVN Awards				
|
|-
|2014			
|Best Product Line for Women (Luna Veneziana Masquerade Collection)
|AVN Awards		
|
|-
|2014	
|Best Lingerie / Apparel Manufacturer
|AVN Awards				
|
|-
|2014		
|Best Lingerie / Apparel Manufacturer (Envy)	
|AVN Awards	
|
|-
|2015
|Lingerie Collection of the Year (After Dark)
|XBIZ Awards
|
|}
Sources:

References

External links
 

Lingerie retailers
Clothing brands of the United States
Lingerie brands
Swimwear manufacturers
Clothing companies established in 2010
2010 establishments in California